The steam locomotives of DR Class 25.10 were passenger train locomotives built for the Deutsche Reichsbahn (DR) in East Germany after World War II.

History 
The Class 25.10 was developed by the DR in 1954. It was built primarily with heavy passenger trains in mind, but was also intended to handle goods traffic. The first of the two trials locomotives to be manufactured was equipped with a mechanical stoker for lump coal. It was given the operating number 25 001. The second example had coal dust firing and was allocated number 25 1001. Only the coal dust fired vehicle was convincing enough, which resulted in the conversion of the first engine to coal dust firing as well in 1958 and its renumbering to 25 1002. The engines did not go into full production however, because the DR Class 23.10 had been designed and built. The makers were the VEB Lokomotivbau "Karl Marx" in Potsdam-Babelsberg.

The two engines were mainly stationed at Arnstadt, where they hauled passenger trains to Weimar, Saalfeld, Erfurt and Meiningen. For a short time, from 1960 to 1962, the engines were homed at Senftenberg depot. However the numerous cracks in the plate frame often required repair and the locomotives were frequently out of service. The 25.10s were retired as early as 1964 and scrapped at Nordhausen in 1968.

Number 25 1001 was equipped with a coal dust tender of Class 2'2' T 27.5. Number 25 001 had a 2'2' 30 tender, which was replaced in 1958 by the coal dust tender of  44 054, when it was converted to coal dust firing. The locomotive was renumbered to 25 1002.

See also 
 List of East German Deutsche Reichsbahn locomotives and railbuses
 Neubaulok

References

25.10
2-8-0 locomotives
25.10
Railway locomotives introduced in 1954
Passenger locomotives
Standard gauge locomotives of Germany
1′D h2 locomotives
LKM locomotives